Charles Auguste Fraikin (14 June 1817 – 22 November 1893) was a Belgian neoclassical sculptor.

Life
Charles Auguste Fraikin was born in Herentals, Belgium, on 14 June 1817. He took drawing lessons from the age of twelve at the Royal Academy of Fine Arts in Antwerp. When he was thirteen, his father died. Fraikin therefore opted for practical training as a pharmacist. He worked in the pharmacy of Auguste-Donat De Hemptinne, brother-in-law of François-Joseph Navez, painter and director of the Brussels Academy, who discovered his talent and encouraged him to continue in the arts.

Marble versions of it were later placed in the Royal Museums of Fine Arts of Belgium and the Hermitage. It brought him to the attention of the Belgian royal family, which led to new commissions. Among other things, he made a statue of King Leopold.

In addition to being a sculptor, Fraikin was also curator of the sculpture department of the Royal Museums of Fine Arts of Belgium.

At the end of his life he had donated his collection of plaster models to the city of Herentals. He died on 22 November 1893 in Schaarbeek.

Incomplete list of works
Brussels:
 Allegory of the City of Brussels (1848), Place Rouppe/Rouppeplein
 Monument to the Counts of Egmont and Horn (1864), Square du Petit Sablon/Kleine Zavelsquare
 Eleven portal images for Brussels' Town Hall
 Mausoleum of Félix de Mérode in the Cathedral of St. Michael and St. Gudula
 Funerary statue of Ferdinand Nicolay at Laeken Cemetery

Dendermonde:
 Monument of Father Pierre-Jean De Smet (1878), 

Ostend:
 Mausoleum for Louise of Orléans (1859), Sint-Petrus-en-Pauluskerk

Gallery

Further reading 
Fraikin Museum in Herenthals, donated by the artist to his hometown in 1891. Gallery catalog, 1891

References

1817 births
1893 deaths
19th-century Belgian sculptors
19th-century Belgian male artists
Neoclassical sculptors
Belgian art curators
People from Herentals